Karamay Airport  is an airport serving Karamay, a city in the autonomous region of Xinjiang in the People's Republic of China. a focus city for China Express Airlines and Joy Air.

Facilities
It has one runway designated 13/31 which measures .

Airlines and destinations

See also
 List of airports in the People's Republic of China

References

External links
 

Airports in Xinjiang
Airports established in 2005